Jiang Ximing (20 September 1913 – 1990), was a Chinese zoologist and politician.

Life
Jiang was born in 1913 in Guanyun County, Jiangsu Province. July 1936, Jiang graduated from the Department of Biology, Zhejiang University. Just after his graduation, Jiang became a lecturer in the same department. In February 1937, Jiang married Xu Ruiyun (徐瑞雲), who later became the first Chinese woman who had a PhD degree in mathematics.

May 1937, Jiang was rewarded a scholarship so that he could study in Germany. 1940, Jiang received PhD from the Ludwig Maximilian University of Munich.

Jiang went back to China, and became a professor in the Department of Biology at Zhejiang University. He later became the director of the department.

After 1949, Jiang served as the vice-president of Zhejiang Normal College (current Zhejiang Normal University), the president of Hangzhou Normal College (different from the current Hangzhou Normal University, the Hangzhou Normal College mentioned here later was merged into the Hangzhou University, and in 1998, Hangzhou University was merged into Zhejiang University). He also served as the vice-president of Hangzhou University, and later became an adviser of the university.

Jiang was the vice-president of the China Zoological Society. He also served twice as the vice-president of the Zhejiang Provincial CPPCC. In 1984, Jiang became a member of the Communist Party of China.

References

1913 births
1990 deaths
Politicians from Lianyungang
Ludwig Maximilian University of Munich alumni
Zhejiang University alumni
20th-century Chinese zoologists
Educators from Lianyungang
Academic staff of Zhejiang University
Academic staff of Zhejiang Normal University
People's Republic of China politicians from Jiangsu
Chinese Communist Party politicians from Jiangsu
Scientists from Lianyungang
Biologists from Jiangsu